Keidje Torres Lima is a Portuguese language political hip hop artist, known professionally as Valete. that has enjoyed critical success in his home country of Portugal.

Life & music career
Valete was born in Lisbon, where he was raised in the Benfica neighborhood. He traveled to Arroja, returned to Benfica, then moved to Amadora and finally settled in Damaia. From a young age he developed strong politic opinions, influenced by his Philosophy teacher at school. During his youth he maintained relations with the JCP (Portuguese Communist Youth) and the PCP (Portuguese Communist Party). However, in the same interview he admitted that despite being a party in which he identifies himself ideologically, he has issues its structure and social agendas. Thus, he prefers to embrace the Bloco de Esquerda (Left Block), because it's closer to his political references. He began listening to rap music in 1991, later encountering such artists like Nas, Krs-one and Racionais MC's.

His career began in 1997 with Adamastor, when they created a group called Canal 115, and later getting signed by Horizontal Records. During that same year, and only sixteen years old, he started recording mix-tapes launched by DJs like Bomberjack and Cruzfader. He continued with Canal 115 for 2 more years constantly performing in his country, but then decided to dedicate himself to his studies, getting a degree in Economics at the Lisbon School of Economics & Management (ISEG).

In 2002 he returned with his album Educação Visual, launched independently and rejecting collaborations. Valete, who before this album was known for being a freestyle or battle MC, clearly showed his lyrical talent with elaborate rhymes, taking on anti-capitalist overtones. In the song "Anti-Herói", he defined himself as a "Trotskista belicista" (a bellicist Trotskist).

His second album Serviço Público was named as one of the best Portuguese hip hop albums of 2006 by the critics. It was selected as the second best national album by the listeners of the Hip hop radio show Suburbano on Coimbra's university radio, RUC.

A prominent hip hop critic, Rui Miguel Abreu, has called him the only political rapper in Portugal.

Discography

Albums
Educação Visual {Visual Education} 2002 - 5,000 copies sold in Portugal
Serviço Público {Public Service} 2006 - 5,000 copies sold in Portugal

Collaborations
Canal 115 project (Valete, Adamastor and Bónus)
Sam the Kid "Pratica(mente)"
Compilation "Nação Hip Hop" - 10 Anos de rap em português" {Hip Hop Nation - 10 years of rap in Portuguese} (May/2003) - song "Nossos Tempos"
Compilation "Primeiro Kombate" {Combat First} (June/2003) - song "À Noite" (with Bónus)
Compilation "Hip Hop Nation #1" (June/2003) - song "Ser Ou Não Ser" (with Bónus)
Compilation "Hip Hop Nation #11" (June/2004) - song "Fim da Ditadura"
Compilation "Poesia Urbana Vol.1" {Urban Poetry} (July/2004)
Compilation "Nação Hip-Hop 2005" {Hip Hop Nation} (January/2005)
Compilation "Hip Hop Nation #17" (February/2005) - collaborates in "Conexões"
CD "Pratica(mente)" (December/2006) of Sam The Kid - collaborates in "Presta Atenção"
Compilation "Adriano, Aqui e Agora - O Tributo" {Adriano, Here and Now - Tribute} (October/2007) - song "Menina dos Olhos Tristes"
CD "Babalaze" (November/2007) of Azagaia - collaborates in song "Alternativos"
CD "Na Linda Da Frente" (May/2010) of GPRO - collaborates in song "Karaboss Remix & G.P.R.O"
CD "Diversidad" (Feb/2011) of Diversidad Experience

Mixtapes
Mixtape "Reencontro do Vinil Vol. 1" (January/1998) of DJ Bomberjack - one song
Mixtape "Reencontro do Vinil Vol. 2" (1998) of DJ Bomberjack - three songs
Mixtape "Volta a Dar Cartas em 99" (1999) of DJ Bomberjack - collaborates in one song
Mixtape "Freestyle Connexion" (November/2002) of DJ Bomberjack & DJ Lusitano - song "Duplo Sentido"
Mixtape "Colisão Ibérica" em 00 de DJ Bomberjack - participa num tema
Mixtape "Lisboa-Porto Connection" (1999) de DJ Cruzfader
Mixtape "Tuga Mix" (1999) of DJ Cruzfader

References

External links
Valete at hi5
Valete discography (including mixtapes) (Portuguese)
Magic Hip Hop
 GangdoMoinho - HipHop Tuga - Hip Hop Tuga e Crioulo, downloads, videoclips, albums, mixtaps, entrevistas, concertos, beefs/battles, novidades e desporto online (Sportv)

Year of birth missing (living people)
Portuguese rappers
Portuguese songwriters
21st-century Portuguese male singers
Living people
Portuguese people of Angolan descent
Singers from Lisbon
20th-century Portuguese male singers